Lynn R. Nakamoto (born May 24, 1960) is an American judge who is a former justice of the Oregon Supreme Court. She was appointed to the court by Governor Kate Brown, and previously served on the Oregon Court of Appeals from 2011 to 2016.

Early life and education
Nakamoto was born in Los Angeles and grew up in Orange County, California. Nakamoto, who is the first member of her family to graduate college, received a Bachelor of Arts in philosophy with honors from Wellesley College in 1982. She then earned her Juris Doctor degree in 1985 at New York University School of Law.

Career
From 1985 to 1987, she worked at Bronx Legal Services in New York City before moving to Oregon in 1987, when she became a staff attorney and acting director of Marion-Polk Legal Aid Service. In 1989, she joined Markowitz, Herbold, Glade & Mehlhaf, a Portland law firm focusing on business litigation, eventually becoming its managing shareholder. She worked there until her appointment to the bench in 2011.

She served as vice chair of the Oregon Board of Bar Examiners in 2001 and chair of the Oregon State Bar's affirmative action committee in 2006.

The Oregon Asian Pacific American Bar Association (OAPABA) presents an award called the Lynn Nakamoto Award at its annual gala dinner.

Judicial service
In 1989, Nakamoto had served as a summer clerk for United States District Judge Helen J. Frye.

In 2011, Governor Ted Kulongoski appointed Nakamoto to the Oregon Court of Appeals, to fill the seat created by Jack Landau's appointment to the Oregon Supreme Court. She was elected unopposed to a six-year term at the 2012 election.

In 2015, Governor Kate Brown named Nakamoto to the Oregon Supreme Court, to fill the vacancy created by Virginia Linder's retirement. Nakamoto is of Japanese descent, and her appointment made her the first Asian American to serve on the supreme court. Nakamoto retired from the court on December 31, 2021.

Personal life
Nakamoto was a founding member of the Oregon Minority Lawyers Association and sat on the board of the Q Center, an LGBT community center in North Portland.

Nakamoto is a lesbian. As of 2021, she is one of twelve openly LGBT state supreme court justices serving in the United States. Nakamoto and her partner have a daughter named Eleanor adopted from Vietnam.

See also
 List of Asian American jurists
 List of LGBT jurists in the United States
 List of LGBT people from Portland, Oregon
 List of LGBT state supreme court justices in the United States

References

1960 births
Living people
21st-century American judges
21st-century American women judges
American jurists of Japanese descent
Asian-American people in Oregon politics
Japanese-American culture in Oregon
Justices of the Oregon Supreme Court
American lesbians
American LGBT people of Asian descent
LGBT appointed officials in the United States
LGBT judges
LGBT lawyers
LGBT people from California
New York University School of Law alumni
Oregon Court of Appeals judges
University of California, Berkeley alumni
Wellesley College alumni